Fornell is a surname. Notable people with the surname include:

Claes Fornell, Swedish business professor
Gladys Fornell (1904-1982), American playwright
Marc Fornell Mestres (born 1982), Spanish tennis player
Marcus Fornell (born 1994), Swedish ice hockey player
Teresa Borràs i Fornell (1923–2010), Spanish composer and pianist